Avroleva Heights are the mostly ice-covered heights rising to 1137 m (Opizo Peak) on the east coast of Brabant Island in the Palmer Archipelago, Antarctica.  They extend 7.3 km in north-south direction from Hill Bay to Svetovrachene Glacier, and 7.3 km in east-west direction from Mitchell Point to Doriones Saddle, which saddle connects the heights to Taran Plateau in Stribog Mountains.  The heights have steep and partly ice-free north and east slopes.

Avroleva is the medieval name of a mountain in Southeastern Bulgaria.

Location
British mapping in 1980 and 2008.

Maps
 Antarctic Digital Database (ADD). Scale 1:250000 topographic map of Antarctica. Scientific Committee on Antarctic Research (SCAR). Since 1993, regularly upgraded and updated.
British Antarctic Territory. Scale 1:200000 topographic map. DOS 610 Series, Sheet W 64 62. Directorate of Overseas Surveys, Tolworth, UK, 1980.
Brabant Island to Argentine Islands. Scale 1:250000 topographic map. British Antarctic Survey, 2008.

Notes

References
 Bulgarian Antarctic Gazetteer. Antarctic Place-names Commission. (details in Bulgarian, basic data in English)
 Avroleva Heights. SCAR Composite Antarctic Gazetteer.

External links
 Avroleva Heights. Copernix satellite image

Mountains of the Palmer Archipelago
Bulgaria and the Antarctic